The Jamaican sharpnosed sphaero (Sphaerodactylus oxyrhinus) is a species of lizard in the family Sphaerodactylidae. It is endemic to Jamaica.

References

Sphaerodactylus
Reptiles of Jamaica
Endemic fauna of Jamaica
Reptiles described in 1850
Taxa named by Philip Henry Gosse